Francesco Monti (il Brescianino) (1646–1703) was an Italian painter of the late-Baroque period, mainly active in his natal city of Brescia, as well as Parma.

He was a pupil of Pietro Ricchi (also known as il Lucchese), then of Jacques Courtois (also known as il Borgognone), who was well known as a battle painter. This association led Monti himself to be called Francesco della Battaglia. For many years before 1700, he worked for the ruling family of Parma. He painted the Blessed Virgin in Adoration of Christ in the Manger for the church of Santa Maria Calcherà in Parma. There are at least three Italian painters that gained the nickname Brescianino.

References

1646 births
1703 deaths
17th-century Italian painters
Italian male painters
18th-century Italian painters
Painters from Brescia
Italian Baroque painters
Italian battle painters
18th-century Italian male artists